Pitishevo is the name of several rural localities in the Chuvash Republic, Russia:
Pitishevo, Alikovsky District, Chuvash Republic, a village in Pitishevskoye Rural Settlement of Alikovsky District
Pitishevo, Krasnochetaysky District, Chuvash Republic, a village in Pandikovskoye Rural Settlement of Krasnochetaysky District